Alain Levèvre (born 6 July 1942) is a French athlete. He competed in the men's long jump at the 1964 Summer Olympics.

References

1942 births
Living people
Athletes (track and field) at the 1964 Summer Olympics
French male long jumpers
Olympic athletes of France
Place of birth missing (living people)